Real Xtreme Fighting (RXF) is a Romanian mixed martial arts (MMA) promotion company based in Brașov, Romania. It is the largest MMA promotion company in Romania. Sebastian Vieru has been RXF president since 2012.

The RXF produces events that showcase nine weight divisions (seven men's divisions and two women's divisions). As of 2020, the RXF has held over 40 events.   

It has strategic partnerships with fellow Bahraini Brave CF and Italian Magnum FC MMA promotions. Its live events and competitions are broadcast on Telekom Sport, Fight Network, DAZN and FightBox.

Cătălin Oțelea, Stelian Gheorghe, Sebastian Hălmăgean, Scott Manhardt and Herb Dean are one of the best known referees working for the organization.

Events

Notable fighters

Male

  Alexandru Lungu
  Florin Lambagiu
  Ion Pascu  
  Nicolae Negumereanu
  Aurel Pîrtea 
  Anatoli Ciumac 
  Diego Nunes
  Kyle Nelson 
  Josh Hill 
  Luke Barnatt
  Levi Matan 
  Jackie Gosh
  Rico Verhoeven
  Carlo Pedersoli Jr. 
  Andrew Tate

Female

  Cristina Stanciu
  Diana Belbiţă
  Micol Di Segni

References

External links
 
 Real Xtreme Fighting at Sherdog

 
2012 establishments in Romania
Mixed martial arts organizations
Sports organizations established in 2012
Mixed martial arts events lists
Companies based in Braşov